Marek Paweł Balt (born 8 April 1973 in Częstochowa) is a Polish politician and economist who has been serving as a Member of the European Parliament since the 2019 elections.

Early life and education
Balt graduated from the Częstochowa University of Technology. He is a member of the Democratic Left Alliance (SLD).

Political career

Career in local politics
In 2004 Balt ran without success to the European Parliament. In the local elections in 2006 and in 2010 he was elected to the Częstochowa City Council, from 2010 to 2011 he was the chairman of the city council.

Member of the Parliament of Poland, 2011–2015
In the parliamentary elections in 2011, he obtained a parliamentary mandate and received 5378 votes. In 2012 he was elected a chairman of the SLD structures in the Silesian Voivodeship. In the 2015 parliamentary elections, he unsuccessfully ran for a parliamentary reelection.

On 23 January 2016 Balk became vice-chairman of SLD. In the local elections in 2018 Balt was elected a councilor to the Silesian Regional Assembly.

Member of the European Parliament, 2019–present
Balt has been a Member of the European Parliament since the 2019 European elections, representing the Silesian Voivodeship. In parliament, he has since been serving on the Committee on the Environment, Public Health and Food Safety. In addition to his committee assignments, he is part of the parliament's delegation for relations with the countries of Southeast Asia and the Association of Southeast Asian Nations (ASEAN).

References 

1973 births
Living people
MEPs for Poland 2019–2024